Francisco de Hoces (died 1526) was a Spanish sailor who in 1525 joined the Loaísa Expedition to the Spice Islands as commander of the vessel San Lesmes.

In January 1526, the San Lesmes was blown by a gale southwards from the eastern mouth of the Strait of Magellan to 56º S latitude, where the crew "thought they saw a land’s end". This is commonly understood as that they saw open waters westward away from a point of land that could be the southeasternmost tip of either Tierra del Fuego or Isla de los Estados. In either case, they supposedly had seen an open water connection between Atlantic and Pacific Oceans south of Tierra del Fuego, so they preceded Francis Drake in inferring the existence of such a connection. This is the reason some Spanish, Argentine, and Chilean historians maintain that Drake Passage should be named Mar de Hoces.

Disappearance and aftermath
After the Loaisa Expedition reached the Pacific through the Strait of Magellan, the whole fleet was dispersed by another gale, and the San Lesmes was seen for the last time in late May 1526. The final fate of San Lesmes has been the subject of much speculation, based in some 16th-century European traces later found in different places around the South Pacific, which suggest she could have reached Easter Island, any of the Polynesian archipelagos, or even New Zealand. Any of these cases would represent the first European landing in the Polynesian Triangle, preceding confirmed European landings in this region by several decades. Australian writer Robert Langdon has been the most prominent supporter of these theories in his books The Lost Caravel and The Lost Caravel Re-explored. 

Following Robert Langdon's death, his theory has since been used as the basis for Greg Scowen's conspiracy thriller The Spanish Helmet, which features de Hoces as one of the main characters.

See also
List of Antarctic expeditions
List of people who disappeared mysteriously at sea

Bibliography
ANALES DE DERECHO. Universidad de Murcia. Número 21. 2003. Págs.217–237
Landín Carrasco, Amancio. España en el mar. Padrón de descubridores. Madrid: Editorial Naval 
Oyarzun, Javier. Expediciones españolas al Estrecho de Magallanes y Tierra de Fuego. Madrid: Ediciones Cultura Hispánica .
Langdon, Robert. The lost caravel re-explored. Canberra: Brolga Press 
Scowen, Greg. The Spanish Helmet. Whare Rama Books

References

1526 deaths
1520s missing person cases
16th-century Spanish people
16th-century explorers
Lost explorers
Spanish explorers of South America
Spanish explorers of the Pacific
Spanish sailors
People lost at sea
Year of birth unknown